Hilläkeste Lake (also known as Meremäe Lake, Meremäe Artificial Lake, Tsirgu Artificial Lake) is a lake in Võru County near Meremäe village. The length of the waterline is 625 metres and surface area of the basin is 1 km2.
Hilläkeste Lake is a recreational area for the people in Meremäe region, where they swim and go fishing. There is a small sandy beach and there used to be a swimming pier that has perished by today. Meremäe rural municipality government has started the process in order to claim the lake as public property.

References

Lakes of Estonia
Lakes of Võru County
Setomaa Parish